Lubentsy is a rural locality (a village) in Sergeikhinskoye Rural Settlement, Kameshkovsky District, Vladimir Oblast, Russia. The population was 199 as of 2010.

Geography 
Lubentsy is located on the Pechuga River, 20 km northwest of Kameshkovo (the district's administrative centre) by road. Novaya Pichuga is the nearest rural locality.

References 

Rural localities in Kameshkovsky District